Nicholas Acquavella (1898-1987) was an American art dealer and gallerist, and the founder of Acquavella Galleries.

Early life
Acquavella was born on 1 July 1898, in Padula, Provincia di Salerno, Kingdom of Italy, and immigrated to the US in 1919, and started dealing privately in Italian art.

Career
He founded Acquavella Galleries in 1921, at 598 Madison Avenue, where he specialised in Italian art.

In 1967, he moved his gallery to 18 East 79th Street, where it remains, and in 1968, his son William Acquavella took over.

Personal life
He was married to Michelina Editta "Edythe" Acquavella (1911-2008), the daughter of Vincenzo Cardillo and Anna Della Valla.

They had one son, William Acquavella, and three grandchildren.

He died on 20 April 1987 at Lenox Hill Hospital in New York City, aged 88.

References

1898 births
1987 deaths
American art dealers